The Halissee Hall is a historic site in Miami, Florida. It is located at 1475 NW 12th Avenue. On October 1, 1974, it was added to the U.S. National Register of Historic Places.

References

External links

 Dade County listings at National Register of Historic Places
 Florida's Office of Cultural and Historical Programs
 Dade County listings
 Halissee Hall
 
 
 
 

Buildings and structures in Miami
National Register of Historic Places in Miami